The 2021 Stanford Cardinal baseball team represented Stanford University in the 2021 NCAA Division I baseball season. The Cardinal played their home games at Klein Field at Sunken Diamond under fourth year coach David Esquer.

Previous season
The Cardinal started the 2020 season losing eight of their first ten games and went 5–11 before the season was canceled due the COVID-19 pandemic.

2020 MLB Draft
The Cardinal had no players drafted in the 2020 MLB draft.

Personnel

Roster

Coaching staff

Schedule and results

Rankings from D1 Baseball.

Stanford Regional

Lubbock Super Regional

College World Series

Rankings

Notes

References

Stanford
Stanford Cardinal baseball seasons
Stanford Cardinal
Stanford
College World Series seasons